My Father the Hero (original French title: Mon père, ce héros) is a 1991 French film directed by Gérard Lauzier and starring Gérard Depardieu. An English language remake of the movie was made in 1994 with Gérard Depardieu reprising his role.

The name of the film comes from a famous poem by the French poet Victor Hugo, "Mon père, ce héros," published in 1859.

Plot 
André (Gérard Depardieu), a Frenchman who is divorced from his wife, takes his beautiful 14-year-old daughter, Véronique (Marie Gillain), on vacation to a paradise island. She is desperate to appear as a woman and not a girl. In order to impress a local boy, Benjamin (Patrick Mille), she makes up more and more fantastic stories, starting with André being her lover – a sugar Daddy. André is desperate to make Véronique happy and so plays along with her increasingly elaborate invented stories about her life.

Production 
Filmed on location on Mauritius, the film introduces Marie Gillain as the young Véronique. Her portrayal of innocence laced with sensuality earned her a nomination for the César Award for Most Promising Actress for her performance. Depardieu, already an established actor, provides a trademark comical performance as André, the 'eager to please' father who does the unthinkable for his daughter.

Cast 
 Gérard Depardieu as André Arnel
 Marie Gillain as Véronique "Véro" Arnel
 Catherine Jacob as Christelle
 Patrick Mille as Benjamin
 Charlotte de Turckheim as Irina
 Gérard Hérold as Patrick
 Jean-François Rangasamy as Pablo
 Koomaren Chetty as Karim
 Benoît Allemane

References

External links 
 
 
 

1991 films
French romantic comedy-drama films
1990s French-language films
Films shot in Mauritius
Films about vacationing
Films directed by Gérard Lauzier
1990s French films